The San Jose Group (SJG) is a privately held multicultural marketing and advertising agency based in Chicago. SJG is a member of the San Jose Network which operates 33 offices in 18 countries, serving 36 markets across the US and Latin America. The agency also operates SJ Public Relations (SJPR) and San Jose Consulting (SJC).

History 

SJG was founded and named after George L. San Jose in 1981. In 1988, SJG moved from their offices on Jackson Blvd, to Michigan Ave. George created SJ Public Relations in 1990. The following year, George created The San Jose Network as a conglomerate of advertising and marketing communications agencies specializing in Latin America. In 1999, the company changed its name from San Jose & Associates to The San Jose Group.

Campaigns and clients
 Budweiser, Bud Light and Michelob Hispanic Market. 
Johnson Wax Hispanic marketing 
Dial bar soaps, body washes and liquid soaps, purex liquid, powder and tablet laundry detergents Hispanic Marketing.
ATA Hispanic traveler campaign
Ameritech's Caller-ID Hispanic campaign 
Hormel’s Herdez brand loyalty among Mexican-American adults.*SPAM in the American Hispanic market.
Illinois Office of Tourism (IOT) Spanish-language website
 American Family Insurance multicultural advertising 
Chicago White Sox Hispanic marketing 
 American Cancer Society in a bilingual campaign by the slogan, "¡No Fumes! (Don't Smoke) Don't Blow It!".
Pleasant Company American Girl Doll, Josefina Montoya event
National Pork Board counter-campaign targeting Hispanics' misbeliefs about pork purchases
U.S. Cellular's Public Relations

Awards
Aurora Awards
 Gold Award "Three Kids," 2011
 Gold Award "Nadie Como Tu," 2011

IABC
 Gold Quill "Multicultural National Pork Board Campaign (El Cerdo Es Bueno.)" 2005

The Publicity Club of Chicago (PCC)
 Edwin J. Shaghnessy Quality of Life Award "Saving Lives Through Awareness, 1993
 PCC Silver Trumpet "¡No Fumes! (Don't Smoke) Don't Blow It!" 1994 
 PCC National Hispanic Marketing Award Hanes Public Relations Campaign, 2000
 Golden Trumpet "Multicultural National Pork Board Campaign (El Cerdo Es Bueno.)" 2005

Platinum PR Awards 
 Honorable Mention "Multicultural National Pork Board Campaign (El Cerdo Es Bueno.)" 2005

PRSA
 Award of Excellence "Multicultural National Pork Board Campaign (El Cerdo Es Bueno.)" 2005

The Service Industry Advertising Awards
 Merit Award: American Family Insurance, 2011

References

External links 
 
 SJ Public Relations
 San Jose Consulting
 The San Jose Network

Advertising agencies of the United States
Consulting firms established in 1981